Vlaszák Géza (born 3 September 1973, Zalaegerszeg) is a Hungarian goalkeeper who currently plays for ZTE FC.

Biography 
At the beginning of his career, he defended in the second division, first with Keszthelyi Haladás and then with the team of the Nagykanizsa Oil Miners. In the 1994–95 season, the Kanizsa team advanced to the first division, with Vlaszák being the second goalkeeper. His first match at the forefront was the Soproni LC - Nagykanizsa Oil Miner match played on 17 September 1994, which ended 7–2. ZTE noticed his performance in Nagykanizsa and signed it. In the spring of 1996, even on his new team, he was just a substitute goalkeeper, but he increasingly played himself into the novice. In 1997 and 1998, he did not miss a single match in the league.

He qualified for MTK in 2000, where he was a defining player in his first year, but was forced to take the bench again the following season. For this reason, he switched in 2002 and was certified for Újpest FC . Here he was a basic person again, he was invited to the national team several times. In the summer of 2006, Újpest FC did not extend its contract, so it became freely justifiable.

External links
 
  
 HLSZ 

1973 births
Living people
People from Zalaegerszeg
Hungarian footballers
Association football goalkeepers
Hungary international footballers
Keszthely FC footballers
Nagykanizsai SC footballers
Zalaegerszegi TE players
MTK Budapest FC players
Újpest FC players
AEL Limassol players
Nemzeti Bajnokság I players
Cypriot First Division players
Hungarian expatriate footballers
Expatriate footballers in Cyprus
Hungarian expatriate sportspeople in Cyprus
Sportspeople from Zala County